A grave is a location where a dead body is buried.

Grave may also refer to:

Phonetics, diacritics and music 
Grave accent, a diacritical mark
backtick or backquote, character on computer keyboards
Grave (phonetic), a term used to classify sounds
Grave, a term for a slow and solemn music tempo or a solemn mood in general
Grave (band), a Swedish death metal band

Places 
Grave, Netherlands, a municipality in the Dutch province North Brabant
La Grave, a commune in southeastern France
Grave (crater), on the Moon

People 
Dmitry Grave (1863–1939), Russian mathematician
Franz Grave (1932-2022), German Roman Catholic bishop
Ivan Grave (1874–1960), Russian scientist

Other uses  
Cognate of German Graf, a historical title of the German nobility, as in margrave
Grave (unit), an old unprefixed name for the kilogram
Grave, the main character in the third-person shooter video games Gungrave and Beyond the Grave
"Grave" (Buffy the Vampire Slayer), the final episode of the sixth season of Buffy the Vampire Slayer
Grave (film), a 2016 film also titled as Raw

See also 
 Graves (disambiguation)
 The Grave (disambiguation)
 The Graves (disambiguation)